Sizov is a rural locality (a khutor) in and the administrative center of Sizovskoye Rural Settlement, Chernyshkovsky District, Volgograd Oblast, Russia. The population was 498 as of 2010. There are 17 streets.

Geography 
Sizov is located on the bank of the Tsimla River, 33 km south of Chernyshkovsky (the district's administrative centre) by road. Basakin is the nearest rural locality.

References 

Rural localities in Chernyshkovsky District